King Fahd Stadium is a multi-use stadium in Ta’if, Saudi Arabia. It hosted some of the 1989 FIFA World Youth Championship and 2005 Islamic Solidarity Games matches. The capacity of the stadium is 17,000 spectators.

See also
 List of things named after Saudi Kings

References

External links
 Stadium information

Football venues in Saudi Arabia